Bordei Verde is a commune located in the central part of Brăila County, Muntenia, Romania. It is composed of three villages: Bordei Verde, Constantin Gabrielescu and Lișcoteanca. The nearest town is Ianca.

The village of Filiu, destroyed by the 1970 floods, has been abandoned.

References

Communes in Brăila County
Localities in Muntenia